Ronald Jay "Ron" Brachman (born 1949) is the director of the Jacobs Technion-Cornell Institute at Cornell Tech. Previously, he was the Chief Scientist of Yahoo! and head of Yahoo! Labs.  Prior to that, he was the Associate Head of Yahoo! Labs and Head of Worldwide Labs and Research Operations.

Education
Brachman earned his B.S.E.E. degree from Princeton University, and his S.M. and Ph.D. degrees from Harvard University.

Career
Prior to working at Yahoo!, Brachman worked at DARPA as the Director of the Information Processing Techniques Office (IPTO), one of DARPA's eight offices at the time.  While at IPTO, he helped develop DARPA's Cognitive Systems research efforts. Before that, he worked at AT&T Bell Laboratories (Murray Hill, New Jersey) as the Head of the Artificial Intelligence Principles Research Department (2004) and Director of the Software and Systems Research Laboratory.  When AT&T split with Lucent in 1996, he became Communications Services Research Vice President and was one of the founders of AT&T Labs.

He is considered by some to be the godfather of Description Logic, the logic-based knowledge representation formalism underlying the Web Ontology Language OWL.]

He was a resident of Westfield, NJ.

Publications
He is the co-author with Hector Levesque of a popular book on knowledge representation and reasoning and many scientific papers.

References

External links 
 External biography

Living people
Artificial intelligence researchers
Knowledge representation
Harvard University alumni
Princeton University School of Engineering and Applied Science alumni
Cornell Tech faculty
Fellow Members of the IEEE
Fellows of the Association for the Advancement of Artificial Intelligence
Yahoo! employees
1959 births
Presidents of the Association for the Advancement of Artificial Intelligence